Franz Friedrich Roger Wilmans (18 July 1812, in Bielefeld – 28 January 1881, in Münster) was a German historian and archivist.

From 1832 he studied philology and history at the University of Berlin, receiving his doctorate in 1835 with a dissertation on Cassius Dio, De Dionis Cassii fontibus et auctoritate. Afterwards, he worked as a schoolteacher at the Cadet Corps and Joachimsthal Gymnasium in Berlin. In 1851 he succeeded Heinrich August Erhard as director of the provincial archives in Münster, a position he maintained up until his death in 1881.

Selected works 
He made important contributions to the Monumenta Germaniae Historica, that included editions of works by Otto von Freising. Among his other principal writings are the following:
 Jahrbücher des Deutschen Reichs unter der Herrschaft König und Kaiser Otto's III., 983-1002, (1840) – Yearbooks on the German Empire under the rule of King and Emperor Otto III, 983–1002. 
 Die Kaiserurkunden der Provinz Westfalen 777–1313 – The royal register of the province of Westphalia 777–1313. 
 Die Urkunden des Karolingischen Zeitalters 777–900, (1867) – Documents of the Carolingian era 777–900.
 Die Urkunden der Jahre 901–1254, (1881) – Records of the years 901–1254.
 Die Schicksale der Reichskleinodien und des Kirchenschatzes des Aachener Krönungsstiftes während der französischen Revolution, (1872) – Fates of the imperial ministries and church treasuries of the Aachen Krönungsstift during the French Revolution.
 Zur Geschichte der Universität Münster in den Jahren 1802–1818. Nach archivalischen Quellen, (1875) – History of the University of Münster in the years 1802–1818; according to archival sources. 
In the Westfälisches Urkundenbuch (Westphalian register) he published:
 Index zu H. A. Erhardts Regesta historiae Westfaliae, (1861) – Index to Erhardt's Regesta historiae Westfaliae.
 Die Urkunden des Bisthums Münster von 1201–1300, (1871) – Records of the Bishopric of Münster from 1201 to 1300.
 Die Urkunden des Bistums Paderborn 1201–1300 – Documents of the Diocese of Paderborn 1201–1300.
 Book 1: Die Urkunden der Jahre 1201–1240, (1871) – Records from the years 1201–1240.
 Book 2: Die Urkunden der Jahre 1241–1250, (1880) – Records from the years 1241–1250.

References 

1812 births
1881 deaths
Writers from Bielefeld
Humboldt University of Berlin alumni
19th-century German historians
German archivists